Life of a Petal is a solo piano album by Stefano Battaglia. It was recorded in 1993 and released by Splasc(h).

Recording and music
The album of solo piano performances by Battaglia was recorded at Murec Studio in Milan on 5 December 1993. Various harmonic structures are prevalent in his playing: "Making original use of arpeggiated scalar devices and intervallic structural shifts (cascading a skein of chords tonally from E flat through to A flat 7 while playing all the tones between on the left hand as the right hand builds scales from each half tone in 9/8 time is a common one) gives Battaglia room to juxtapose stylistic considerations not only from jazz but European classical musical as well".

Release and reception

Life of a Petal was released by Splasc(h), as was Baptism, another Battaglia solo piano album from the same year. The AllMusic review concluded: "this is a physical record with spiritual undertones, a perfect mirror for Baptism in that it shows Battaglia's mettle as both the most inventive pianist of his generation in Italy [...] and his truly eloquent compositional language." The Penguin Guide to Jazz commented that the pieces "often seem to be seeking an individual point that never arrives."

Track listing
"Poem Pour Rûmî" – 3:51
"Tell Me What It Is" – 3:50
"Etude" – 6:11
"Eldila" – 2:20
"Blowed" – 5:29
"Recitative" – 3:22
"Tatum" – 3:03
"Life of a Petal" – 4:16
"Magnetic Love Field" – 3:01
"Taste" – 3:18
"Vision" – 3:35
"Hymn" – 5:31

Personnel
Stefano Battaglia – piano

References

1993 albums
Solo piano jazz albums
Stefano Battaglia albums